Pariz Rural District is a rural district (dehestan) in Pariz District, Sirjan County, Kerman Province, Iran. At the 2006 census, its population was 3,065, in 786 families. The rural district has 54 villages.

References 

Rural Districts of Kerman Province
Sirjan County